Santam is a South African financial services group that also has business interests in Malawi, Tanzania, Uganda, Zimbabwe and Zambia. Santam's head office is located in Bellville in the Western Cape, South Africa. The company is listed on the Johannesburg Stock Exchange (JSE) and is South Africa's largest short-term insurer.

History 
The Suid-Afrikaanse Nasionale Trust en Assuransie Maatskappy (South African National Trust and Assurance Company Limited) (Santam) was established on 28 March 1918. One month later the South African Life Assurance Company (Sanlam) was established as a full subsidiary of Santam to focus on life assurance while Santam remained focused on short-term insurance.
Santam is a subsidiary of South African financial services group Sanlam, which holds 62.3% of Santam’s shares. Santam released their annual financial results for 2022 on 2 March 2023.

Leadership 
As on 1 March 2023, Santam's executive management consists of:
 Group Chief Executive Officer: Tavaziva Madzinga
 Group Chief Financial Officer: Hennie Nel 
 Executive Head: Santam Commercial and Personal: Edward Gibbens
 Executive Head: Santam Specialist business - Quinten Matthew
 Executive Head: Underwriting, Reinsurance and International: John Melville
 Executive Head: Human Resources Enid Lizamore
 Head: Market Development & Sustainability: Karl Socikwa
 Chief Executive Officer of MiWay: Burton Naicker
 Executive Head: strategic business development - Gerald van Wyk
 Executive Head: Intermediated Business - Andrew Coutts
 Chief Risk Officer, Asher Grevler

Major shareholders 
Below are the group's largest shareholders as at 31 December 2022:

References

External links
 

Financial services companies established in 1918
Insurance companies of South Africa
1918 establishments in South Africa
Companies listed on the Johannesburg Stock Exchange
Financial services companies of South Africa
Companies based in Cape Town